The Conglomérat de Cernay is a geologic formation in Champagne-Ardenne, northern France. It preserves fossils dating back to the Thanetian stage of the Paleocene period. The lizard Cernaycerta and placental mammal Bustylus cernaysi are named after the formation.

Fossil content 
The formation has provided fossils of:

Mammals 
Primates

 Berruvius lasseroni
 Chiromyoides campanicus
 Plesiadapis remensis
 P. tricuspidens
 Sarnacius gingerichi

Acreodi
 Dissacus europaeus

Eutheria
 Landenodon lavocati

Macroscelidea

 Berrulestes pellouini
 B. phelizoni
 B. poirieri
 Dipavali petri
 Gigarton louisi
 G. meyeri
 G. sigogneauae
 Louisina marci
 L. mirabilis
 Thryptodon brailloni
 Walbeckodon girardi

Multituberculata
 Hainina godfriauxi
 H. vianeyae

Perissodactyls

 Paschatherium dolloi
 Phakodon levei
 Teilhardimys brisswalteri

Placentalia

 Bustylus cernaysi
 B. germanicus
 Remiculus deutschi
 Tricuspiodon rutimeyer
 T. sobrinus
 Afrodon sp.
 Tricuspiodon sp.

Theriiformes
 Adapisoriculidae indet.

Birds 

 Berruornis orbisantiqui
 Eupterornis remensis
 Gastornis parisiensis
 Remiornis heberti

Reptiles 
Crocodiles
 Diplocynodon remensis

Lizards

 Camptognathosaurus parisiensis
 Cernaycerta duchaussoisi
 Eolacerta sp.
 Necrosaurus sp.
 Amphisbaenidae indet.

Turtles

 Compsemys russelli
 Laurasichersis relicta
 Trionyx sp.
 Cryptodira indet.

Amphibians 

 Palaeoproteus gallicus
 Koalliella sp.
 Palaeobatrachus sp.
 cf. Salamandra sp.
 Bufonidae indet.
 Neobatrachia indet.

See also 

 List of fossiliferous stratigraphic units in France
 Thanetian formations
 Tuffeau de St Omer
 Cerrejón Formation
 Danata Formation
 DeBeque Formation
 Willwood Formation

References

Bibliography 

 
 
 
 
 
 
 
 
 
 
 
 
 
 
 
 
 
 
 
 
 
 
 

Geologic formations of France
Paleocene Series of Europe
Paleogene France
Thanetian Stage
Conglomerate formations
Fossiliferous stratigraphic units of Europe
Paleontology in France